Pariza is a hamlet and minor local entity located in the municipality of Condado de Treviño, in Burgos province, Castile and León, Spain. As of 2020, it has a population of 19.

Geography 
Pariza is located 113km east-northeast of Burgos.

References

Populated places in the Province of Burgos